The third and final season of Faking It, an American single-camera romantic comedy, premiered on March 15, 2016, on the MTV network. The show was renewed for a third season on April 21, 2015. Ten new episodes were produced.

Plot
When their first summer apart comes to an end, Amy (Rita Volk) returns home and is ready to continue her friendship with Karma (Katie Stevens) now that she has finally moved on from her. But the two struggle to get their friendship back on track. Shane (Michael Willett), who is now friends with Karma, is caught between his friendship with both Amy and Karma. Liam (Gregg Sulkin) and Zita (Chloe Bridges) are now dating after spending the summer trying to find out more about Liam's past.

Cast and characters

Main cast

 Katie Stevens as Karma Ashcroft
 Rita Volk as Amy Raudenfeld
 Gregg Sulkin as Liam Booker
 Michael Willett as Shane Harvey
 Bailey De Young as Lauren Cooper

Recurring cast
 Rebecca McFarland as Farrah
 Senta Moses as Penelope Bevier
 Erick Lopez as Tommy Ortega
 Courtney Kato as Leila
 Amy Farrington as Molly
 Lance Barber as Lucas
 Dan Gauthier as Bruce Cooper
 August Roads as Oliver Walsh
 Chloe Bridges as Zita Cruz
 Parker Mack as Felix Turner
 Elliot Fletcher as Noah
 McKaley Miller as Rachel
 Jordan Rodrigues as Dylan
 Sophia Taylor Ali as Sabrina

Production
The series was pick-up for another season on April 21, 2015, set to premiere in 2016.  Ten new episodes were produced. The episodes are broadcast on the time slot of Tuesdays 10:30PM ET/PT. A day before the supposed season finale, it was announced by MTV that the series would be cancelled after 3 seasons, marking the season finale as the series finale. The cancellations comes to low ratings, and also MTV's strategy plan to focus on reality shows.

Episodes

References

External links

2016 American television seasons